Presidential elections were held in Slovenia on 23 October 2022. Since no candidate received a majority of the vote, a run-off between the top two placing candidates, Slovenian Democratic Party candidate Anže Logar and independent candidate Nataša Pirc Musar, took place on 13 November 2022. Incumbent President Borut Pahor was ineligible to run for a third consecutive term due to term limits. Pirc Musar won the run-off with 53.86% of the vote, becoming the first female president of Slovenia. 

Logar acknowledged his defeat and congratulated Pirc Musar on her victory.

Important dates

Electoral system 
The President of Slovenia is elected using the two-round system; if no candidate receives a majority of the vote in the first round, the top two candidates contest a runoff.

Under Slovenia's election law, candidates for president are required to meet one of three criteria:

 The support of ten members of the National Assembly
 The support of one or more political parties and either three members of the National Assembly or signatures from 3,000 voters
 Signatures from 5,000 voters

Each political party could support only one candidate.

Candidates 
Nataša Pirc Musar is a former president of the Slovenian Red Cross, a prominent human rights lawyer and was head of the data protection agency.. She stands for a center-left government and a pro-European Union policy. In view of Russo-Ukrainian War, she believed that Russia broke international law. Pirc Musar ran as an independent, but her campaign was supported by two former presidents, Milan Kučan and Danilo Türk as well as the Pirate party.  

Anže Logar was a longtime member of the Slovenian Democratic Party (SDS) and a former Foreign Minister. He chose to officially be an independent candidate which was viewed as a distancing himself from the ousted government. 

Milan Brglez was a candidate of the Social Democrats (SD) supported by the Freedom Movement, and incumbent prime minister Robert Golob.

Advanced to runoff

Did not advance to runoff

Opinion polls

Graph

First round

Second round

Results
In the first round Anže Logar received 34% of the voter share against 27% for Nataša Pirc Musar.  Milan Brglez was third with around 15%. For the second round Golob then turned his support to Pirc Musar. 

In the run-off, independent Pirc Musar was expected to win since August 2022. Logar also ran as an independent, but was a member of the Slovenian Democratic Party (SDS), which lost parliamentary elections six months prior. Logar is therefore associated with Janša, who was accused with attempting to restrict the freedom of expression and undermine the independence of the judiciary during his term in office.

In the evening of 13 November 2022, the electoral commission reported that Pirc Musar won with nearly 54% of the vote, after which Logar conceded defeat and congratulated Pirc Musar on her victory. Pirc Musar will become Slovenia's first female president, commander-in-chief of the Slovenian Army and also be responsible for appointing the head of the Central Bank of Slovenia.

References

Presidential elections in Slovenia
Presidential
Slovenia
Slovenia
Election and referendum articles with incomplete results